Robert Remi "Bob" Crawford (born April 6, 1959) is a Canadian-born American former professional ice hockey player and coach. He played seven seasons in the National Hockey League between 1979 and 1987 with the St. Louis Blues, Hartford Whalers, New York Rangers, Washington Capitals. After retiring as a player Crawford turned to coaching at the youth level. Two of his brothers, Marc and Lou, also played in the NHL. Internationally Crawford played for the United States junior team at three World Junior Championships.

Career statistics

Regular season and playoffs

International

Coaching career
Crawford's coaching career saw him win multiple championships. He helped the Connecticut Junior Clippers/Wolfpack become one of the top programs in the United States, with over 150 of his players graduating to NCAA Division I college hockey. In 2001 the Clippers won the US National Championship. He also worked on the Board of Directors for USA Hockey, serving as the New England Director.

Crawford also coached East Catholic High School in Manchester, Connecticut.

Outside of coaching, Crawford was the owner/operator of the multi-rink/fitness facility Champions Skating Center which includes the New England Athletic Club, a 35,000 square-foot center that includes a 6-lane, 25-meter pool. He also bought the Bolton Ice Palace and ISCC the International Skating Center of Connecticut. Crawford also worked as director and developer of The City of Hartford "Winterfest" Ice Arena, located outdoors in Hartford's Bushnell Park.

External links

Profile at hockeydraftcentral.com

1959 births
Living people
Binghamton Whalers players
Canadian ice hockey forwards
Cornwall Royals players
Hartford Whalers players
Ice hockey people from Ontario
Krefeld Pinguine players
New Haven Nighthawks players
New York Rangers players
Salt Lake Golden Eagles (CHL) players
Salt Lake Golden Eagles (IHL) players
St. Louis Blues draft picks
St. Louis Blues players
Sportspeople from Belleville, Ontario
Washington Capitals players